The Southeastern District is one of the 35 districts of the Lutheran Church–Missouri Synod (LCMS). It encompasses Washington, D.C. and the states of Delaware, North Carolina, South Carolina, and Virginia, as well Maryland with the exception of Garrett County at its western end; it also includes York and Lancaster Counties in Pennsylvania. Garrett County and the rest of Pennsylvania are part of the Eastern District; also, one Virginia congregation is in the non-geographic English District, and two of the state's congregations are in the SELC District. The Southeastern District includes approximately 219 congregations and missions, subdivided into 19 circuits, as well as 64 preschools, 21 elementary schools and three high schools. Baptized membership in district congregations is over 52,000.

The Southeastern District was formed in 1939 out of the Eastern District, and also incorporated a number of congregations which had previously been in the English District – including those in the Carolinas and part of Georgia; the Georgia areas were separated into the Florida-Georgia District in 1948. District offices are located in Alexandria, Virginia. Delegates from each congregation meet in convention every three years to elect the district president, vice presidents, circuit counselors, a board of directors, and other officers. The Rev. Dr. William Harmon was elected and installed as district president in 2022.

Presidents
Rev. J. George Spilman, 1939–1945
Rev. Oscar Adelbert Saner, 1945–1948
Rev. Rudolph Stang Ressmeyer, 1948–1954
Rev. William H. Kohn, 1954–1959
Rev. Leslie F. Frerking, 1959–1963
Rev. William H. Kohn, 1963–1967
Rev. Martin C. Poch, 1967–1970
Rev. Charles S. Mueller, 1970–1978
Rev. Richard T. Hinz, 1978–1994
Rev. Roy A. Maack, 1994–1997
Rev. Dr. Arthur W. Scherer, 1997–2003
Rev. Dr. Jon T. Diefenthaler, 2003–2012
Rev. Dr. John R. Denninger, 2012–2022
Rev. Dr. William Harmon, 2022–present

References

External links8
Southeastern District web site
LCMS: Southeastern District
LCMS Congregation Directory

Lutheran Church–Missouri Synod districts
Lutheranism in Delaware
Lutheranism in Maryland
Protestantism in North Carolina
Lutheranism in Pennsylvania
Protestantism in South Carolina
Lutheranism in Virginia
Lutheranism in Washington, D.C.
Christian organizations established in 1939
Religion in the Southern United States
1939 establishments in the United States